Eliécer Silva Celis (Floresta, Colombia, 20 January 1914 – Sogamoso, 4 July 2007) was a Colombian anthropologist, archaeologist, professor and writer. He is considered a pioneer in the anthropology of Colombia. Silva Celis is known in Colombia for the reconstruction of the Sun Temple, the most important temple of the Muisca religion.

Eliécer Silva Celis has published many books and articles about the Muisca and other indigenous groups of Colombia, only in Spanish.

Biography 

Eliécer Silva Celis was born in Tobasía, vereda of Floresta, Boyacá on January 20, 1914. He became an orphan at young age and worked as street vendor and at the construction of the railway of Antioquia.

In 1937, at age 23, Silva Celis managed to finish his secondary education. The same year he entered the Escuela Normal Superior de Colombia in Bogotá, where Silva Celis got to know later famous people who fled the Nazis in Europe: Paul Rivet, Rudolf Hommes, Justus W. Schottellius, José Francisco Socarras, Gregorio Hernández de Alba and José de Recasens, among others. They taught Silva Celis ethnology, archaeology, physical anthropology, history, philosophy and linguistics.

In 1942 Silva Celis uncovered a Muisca cemetery with indigenous tombs in the Mochacá neighbourhood in Sogamoso. He found Muisca mummies and could establish the precise location where the Temple of the Sun of the Muisca had been. The Temple, dedicated to Muisca Sun god Sué, was destroyed by soldiers in the army of Gonzalo Jiménez de Quesada on September 4, 1537. When De Quesada's soldiers Miguel Sánchez and Juan Rodríguez Parra raided the Sun Temple in September 1537, they found mummies decorated with golden crowns and other objects sitting on raised platforms. With the finding of the location of the temple, he founded the Parque Indígena del Sol, present-day site of the Archaeology Museum in Sogamoso. The museum hosts more than 5000 pieces of the Muisca civilisation. In this museum he also reconstructed the Sun Temple. Later, Eliécer Silva Celis rediscovered El Infiernito, close to Villa de Leyva, an astronomical observatory of the Muisca. Silva Celis founded the Archaeological Park in Monquirá.

In 1943, Eliécer Silva Celis found five skulls which were later dated to be between 8890 and 8630 years old.

In 1944, Silva Celis studied the famous Tierradentro culture of Huila, findings from La Belleza in Santander and in the following years the Lache of the Sierra Nevada del Cocuy.

The mummy from Sativanorte, named SO10-IX belongs to the collection of Silva Celis in the Archaeology Museum of Sogamoso. It has been studied in detail by various researchers. The mummy has been donated to Silva Celis by Abraham López Ávila in 1962. Interviews with López Ávila revealed that the mummy had been found by children in the vicinity of Sativanorte, Sativasur and Socotá on the western bank of the Chicamocha River.

Silva Celis was co-founder of the UPTC in Tunja, Boyacá in 1953. He served as rector of the university twice. In 1966, Silva Celis studied Muisca stones found in Mongua, Boyacá. Silva Celis has written more than 400 articles.

Eliécer Silva Celis died on July 4, 2007 at an age of 93 years, after dedicating more than 60 years of his life to knowledge about the Muisca and other indigenous groups in Colombia.

Works 
This list is a selection.

Books 
 2006 – Estudios sobre la cultura chibcha
 1979 – Proyecto del parque arqueológico y botánico en villa de Leyva: sitio "El Infiernito"
 1968 – Arqueología y prehistoria de Colombia; [Bochica o Nemqueteba]
 1967 – Antiguedad de la civilizacin̤ Chibcha
 1966 – Las estatuas de la Salina de Mongua
 1945 – Contribucion al conocimiento de la civilización de los Lache

Articles 
 1965 – Una inspeccion arqueologica por el alto Rio Minero
 1965 – Antigüedad y relaciones de la civilización Chibcha
 1963 – Los petroglifos de "El Encanto" – Florencia, Caquetá
 1963 – Movimiento de la civilización agustiniana sobre el alto Amazonas
 1962 – Pinturas rupestres precolombinas de Sáchica, Valle de Leiva
 1951 – Investigación de antropología social en Tota, Boyacá
 1947 – Sobre arqueología y antropología Chibcha
 1946 – Cráneos de Chiscas

Trivia 
 Honouring Silva Celis, the Archaeology Museum, Sogamoso, administered by his anthropologist daughter, has been renamed after him

See also 

List of Muisca scholars
Muisca art
Muisca
Muisca mummification, Sun Temple
El Infiernito, Archaeology Museum Silva Celis, Sáchica

References

Notable works by Silva Celis

Bibliography

External links 
  Interview with Eliécer Silva Celis
  Video about the Sun Temple in Sogamoso

1914 births
2007 deaths
Colombian anthropologists
20th-century Colombian historians
Colombian archaeologists
Pedagogical and Technological University of Colombia people
Muisca scholars
20th-century archaeologists
20th-century anthropologists